The Gwangju Biennale is a  contemporary art biennale founded in September 1995 in Gwangju, South Jeolla province, South Korea. The Gwangju Biennale is hosted by the Gwangju Biennale Foundation and the city of Gwangju. The Gwangju Biennale Foundation also hosts the Gwangju Design Biennale, founded in 2004.

History
 Beyond Borders: The 1st Gwangju Biennale, 20 September to 20 November 1995
 Unmapping the Earth: The 2nd Gwangju Biennale, 1 September to 27 November 1997
 Man and Space: The 3rd Gwangju Biennale, 29 March to 7 June 2000
 P_A_U_S_E: The 4th Gwangju Biennale, 29 March - 29 June 2002
 A Grain of Dust A Drop of Water: The 5th Gwangju Biennale, 8th Sept to 11 Nov 2004
 Fever Variations: The 6th Gwangju Biennale, 8 September to 11 November 2006
 On the Road / Position Papers / Insertions: The 7th Gwangju Biennale, 5th Sept to 9 Nov 2008
 10,000 LIVES: The 8th Gwangju Biennale, 3 September to 7 November 2010
 ROUNDTABLE: The 9th Gwangju Biennale, 7 September to 11 November 2012
 Burning Down the House: The 10th Gwangju Biennale, 5 September to 9 November 2014, curated by Jessica Morgan, Fatoş Üstek and Emiliano Valdes
 The Eighth Climate (What does art do?): The 11th Gwangju Biennale, 2 September to 6 November 2016
 Imagined Borders: The 12th Gwangju Biennale, 7 September to 11 November 2018
 Minds Rising Spirits Tuning: The 13th Gwangju Biennale, 1 April to 9 May 2021, curated by Defne Ayas and Natasha Ginwala
 Soft and weak like water: The 14th Gwangju Biennale, 7 April to 9 July 2023, curated by Sook-Kyung Lee

References

External links
 Gwangju Biennale

Korean art
Art biennials
Gwangju
Recurring events established in 1995